Melman or variant, may refer to:

People
 Seymour Melman (1917–2004), American professor of industrial engineering and operations research
 Jeff Melman, American television producer and director
 Calvert DeForest, American actor whose stage name was "Larry 'Bud' Melman"
 Yossi Melman,, Israeli writer and journalist
 Melvin "Mel-Man" Bradford, American record producer affiliated with Aftermath Entertainment
 Melvin "Mel-Man" Breeden, American record producer, CEO of Big Cat Records and Radar Live Music & Radar (E)Sports

Fiction
 Melman (Madagascar), a fictional character from the Madagascar animated film series, A hypochondriac giraffe
 Roxanne Melman, a fictional character from the TV show L.A. Law

See also 

 
 
 Mehlman (western/original form)
 Milman (disambiguation)
 Mel (disambiguation)
 Man (disambiguation)